Ilkhani or Ilkhanid may refer to:
 Ilkhanate, a breakaway khanate of the Mongol Empire
 Zij-i Ilkhani, a Zij book with astronomical tables of planetary movements

People
 Mohammad Ilkhani, Iranian philosopher
 Emam Gholi Khan Haji Ilkhani, the great ilkhan of Bakhtiari tribe

Places in Iran
 Seyyedabad-e Ilkhani
 Jafarabad, Tabas (Deh-e Ilkhani)
 Mohammadabad-e Ilkhani